Linda Smith may refer to:
Linda Smith (comedian) (1958–2006), English radio comedy performer, stand-up comic and writer
Linda Smith (American politician) (born 1950), American congresswoman, 1995–1999
Linda Smith (novelist) (1949–2007), Canadian writer of children's fiction
Linda B. Smith (active since 1993), American psychology professor
Linda Smith (dancer), American artistic director in Utah Repertory Dance Theatre
Linda Catlin Smith (born 1957), American composer
Linda Ellerbee (born 1944), a.k.a. Linda Smith, American journalist
Linda Smith Dyer (1946–2001), American women's rights activist
Linda Tuhiwai Smith, New Zealand education academic
Linda Smith, American home recording artist
Linda Smith (bowls), Hong Kong international lawn bowler

See also 
Linda Smyth, American politician from Virginia